Daniel "Paul" Frazier (November 12, 1967 – December 18, 2018) was a professional American football player who played for the New Orleans Saints. He played college football at Northwestern State University.

Personal life
He was born in Beaumont, Texas.

References

1967 births
2018 deaths
American football running backs
Sportspeople from Beaumont, Texas
Players of American football from Texas
New Orleans Saints players
Northwestern State Demons football players
Deaths from colorectal cancer
Deaths from cancer in Texas